Club Social Corire (sometimes referred as Social Corire) is a Peruvian football club, playing in the city of Corire, Castilla, Arequipa, Peru.

History
The Club Social Corire was founded on June 13, 1943.

In 2009 Liga Superior de Arequipa, the club was eliminated when finished in 4th place.

In 2011 Copa Perú, the club classified to the Departamental Stage, but was eliminated when finished in 3th place.

In 2015 Copa Perú, the club classified to the Departamental Stage, but was eliminated by La Colina in the Semifinals.

In 2016 Copa Perú, the club classified to the Departamental Stage, but was eliminated by San Jacinto in the Second Stage.

In 2017 Copa Perú, the club classified to the Departamental Stage, but was eliminated by Sportivo Huracán in the Second Stage.

In 2018 Copa Perú, the club classified to the National Stage, but was eliminated when finished in 46th place.

Honours

Regional
Liga Departamental de Arequipa:
Runner-up (3): 1971, 1978, 2018

Liga Provincial de Castilla:
Winners (15): 1967, 1969, 1970, 1971, 1973, 1974, 1975, 1976, 1978, 1979, 2011, 2014, 2015, 2016, 2017
Runner-up (2): 2000, 2013

Liga Unificada de Castilla:
Winners (1): 2018

Liga Distrital de Uraca:
Winners (4): 1978, 2015, 2016, 2017

See also
List of football clubs in Peru
Peruvian football league system

References

External links
 

Football clubs in Peru
Association football clubs established in 1943
1943 establishments in Peru